St. Joseph's of the Woods English-Medium Higher Secondary School is a Catholic Co-Educational higher secondary school in Thrikkakkara (Kalamassery), Kochi in the Indian state of Kerala. It was founded in 1963 by the Carmelite Sisters of St. Teresa.

Institutions  
Institutions in the same campus includes 
 St. Joseph's Lower Primary School
 St. Joseph's Upper Primary School
 St. Joseph's Higher Secondary School
 St. Joseph's Public School, a Senior Secondary School
 St. Joseph's Chapel
 St. Joseph's Convent

Other related institutions 
 St. Teresa's College, Ernakulam
 St Teresa's Convent Girls' Higher Secondary School, Ernakulam
 St. Albert's College, Ernakulam 
 St. Albert's High School
 St. Paul's College

References

Carmelite educational institutions
Catholic secondary schools in India
Christian schools in Kerala
High schools and secondary schools in Kochi
Educational institutions established in 1963
1963 establishments in Kerala